These are the results of the Women's 400 metres event at the 1995 World Championships in Athletics in Gothenburg, Sweden.

Medalists

Results

Heats
First 3 of each heat (Q) and the next 3 fastest (q) qualified for the semifinals.

Semifinals
First 2 of each heat (Q) and the next 2 fastest (q) qualified for the final.

Final

References
 Results
 IAAF

- Women's 400 Metres
400 metres at the World Athletics Championships
1995 in women's athletics